Nicasio (Spanish for "Nicasius") is an unincorporated community and census-designated place in Marin County, California, United States. As of the 2020 census the CDP population was 81, while population estimates for the surrounding area range from about 600 to about 900 people.

Within Nicasio and the surrounding area are about 250 homes located on approximately 350 parcels. Much of the land is still used for agricultural purposes including beef and dairy cattle grazing, small-scale truck farming (including organic farming), and the raising of forage. Several small vineyards have also been recently established. Next to Rancho Nicasio within the town of Nicasio is an organic farm, AllStar Organics, owned and operated by Janet Brown and Marty Jacobson; Janet is the vice-president of Marin Organic, Marin County's non-profit organic association. Just north of Nicasio Reservoir is Fairlea Ranch, where pedigree longhorn cattle are raised. The most significant non-agricultural business within Nicasio is George Lucas' Skywalker Ranch, a part of Lucasfilm Ltd. According to a 2004 Forbes magazine real estate survey, Nicasio is the 23rd most expensive ZIP code in the US. Nicasio has the highest per capita income ($211,993) of any census-designated place in California.

Centrally located in this area is the small village of Nicasio itself. The village is in area codes 415/628.  The town center has a post office (ZIP code 94946), a general store, a tiny real estate office, St. Mary's Church (established in 1867), Nicasio Volunteer Fire Department, a baseball field located in the town square, the Rancho Nicasio Bar & Restaurant, a Druid's Hall, as well as a number of private homes. The town was founded in the early 19th century to support local agricultural, timber, and fishing activities.  The town once contained the twenty-two-room Hotel Nicasio, which opened in 1867 but burned down in December 1940. Just north of town on Nicasio Valley Road next to the modern-day school building for Nicasio School District is a one-room schoolhouse that opened in 1871. The building is currently a listed historical landmark.  The Nicasio post office opened in 1871, closed in 1899, and reopened in 1900.

In 2008, Dewey Livingston wrote a detailed history of the region titled Nicasio: The Historic Valley at the Center of Marin.

Geography 
The Nicasio region is a hydrologic zone containing the four main drainages of Nicasio Creek up to the ridgelines defining their basin. It includes the south fork of Nicasio Creek extending from Moon Hill, along the ridge separating Nicasio from San Geronimo and Samuel P. Taylor State Park, and extending northwest towards the northern end of Platform Bridge Road; the east fork (Lucas Valley fork) of Nicasio Creek extending from Loma Alta and the ridge on the north side of Sir Francis Drake Boulevard, extending up through Big Rock and up towards Big-Rock Ridge; the Halleck Creek drainage, up to the ridges separating Nicasio from Novato; the northern drainages extending along the ridgelines of Rocky Ridge, Hicks Mountain and Black Mountain.

A major landmark in the area is the man-made Nicasio Reservoir.  Nicasio is surrounded by forested and open ridge lines surrounding a wide rolling valley.  The area along Lucas Valley Road follows a narrow valley with mostly forested hillsides above it.  Oak, bay, and fir trees are common in the area, and along some of the creeks stands of redwoods are still found.  Wildlife is abundant; the Nicasio chickadee, a subspecies of the chestnut-backed chickadee, was named by Robert Ridgway. Three main roads cross the area: Lucas Valley Road, Nicasio Valley Road, and the Point Reyes-Petaluma Road. Important pieces of public land in the surrounding area include Point Reyes National Seashore, portions of the Golden Gate National Recreation Area, and Samuel P. Taylor State Park.

Demographics
The 2010 United States Census reported that Nicasio village had a population of 96. The racial makeup of the CDP was 97.9% White and 2.1% African American. 7.3% of the population was Hispanic American or Latino of any race.

There were 35 households, out of which 15 (42.9%) had children under the age of 18 living in them, 19 (54.3%) were opposite-sex married couples living together, 6 (17.1%) had a female householder with no husband present, 3 (8.6%) had a male householder with no wife present.  There were 2 (5.7%) unmarried opposite-sex partnerships, and 0 (0%) same-sex married couples or partnerships. 6 households (17.1%) were made up of individuals, and 4 (11.4%) had someone living alone who was 65 years of age or older. The average household size was 2.74.  There were 28 families (80.0% of all households); the average family size was 3.07.

The population was spread out, with 28 people (29.2%) under the age of 18, 5 people (5.2%) aged 18 to 24, 21 people (21.9%) aged 25 to 44, 29 people (30.2%) aged 45 to 64, and 13 people (13.5%) who were 65 years of age or older.  The median age was 42.5 years. For every 100 females, there were 113.3 males.  For every 100 females age 18 and over, there were 88.9 males.

The homeowner vacancy rate was 0%; the rental vacancy rate was 12.5%. 81.3% of the population lived in owner-occupied housing units and 18.8% lived in rental housing units.

Filming location

The People (1972), a made-for-TV movie starring William Shatner; locations include St. Mary's Church and the town square
Shoot the Moon (1982), starring Albert Finney and Diane Keaton
Village of the Damned (1995), locations including Nicasio School and homes and regions in Nicasio

The 1993 song "Daughter" by Pearl Jam was recorded in Nicasio.

Government

Notable residents
 Jerry Garcia – lived in Nicasio from late 1992 until his death in 1995

Gallery

See also

 Rancho Nicasio

References

External links
 Nicasio community website

Census-designated places in Marin County, California
West Marin
Census-designated places in California